Poland competed at the 2012 European Athletics Championships in Helsinki, Finland, from 27 June - 1 July 2012. A delegation of 57 athletes were sent to represent the country.

Medals

References

Nations at the 2012 European Athletics Championships
2012
European Athletics Championships